Mateusz Gniazdowski (born 1974 in Warsaw) is a Polish political scientist, since 2022 serving as an ambassador to the Czech Republic.

Life 
In 2000, Gniazdowski graduated with honours from Political Science at the University of Warsaw. He received his doctoral degree from the Slovak Academy of Sciences. From 2004 to 2010 he worked at the Polish Institute of International Affairs (PISM). He was deputy head of the PISM Research Office and co-ordinator of the programme for bilateral relations in Europe. In 2010, he joined the Centre for Eastern Studies (OSW). He was head of the Central European Department. Between 15 February 2016 and September 2022 he was Deputy Director there. On 22 August 2022 he was nominated Poland ambassador to the Czech Republic. He took his post on 16 September 2022, and presented his credentials to President Miloš Zeman on 21 September 2022.

He specializes in internal and foreign policy and regional cooperation of the Central European countries, especially the Visegrad Group; public diplomacy; historical issues in foreign policy.

He was chairman of the Policy Board of the Czech-Polish Forum, a member of the Polish-Slovak Commission for the Humanities at the Ministry of Science and Higher Education of Poland, and at the Ministry of Education, Science, Research and Sport of Slovakia. He was a member of the Editorial Committee of the Polish Diplomatic Review [Polski Przegląd Dypomatyczny], and co-coordinator of the Polish part of the Think Visegrad – V4 Think Tank Platform.

His is married with two daughters.

Honours 

 Bene Merito honorary badge, Poland, 2022

References 

1974 births
Ambassadors of Poland to the Czech Republic
Living people
Polish political scientists
University of Warsaw alumni